For other municipalities with the same name, see  Fiadanana (disambiguation)

Fiadanana (Ankazobe)  is a town in Analamanga Region, in the  Central Highlands of Madagascar, in the district of Ankazobe. It is located north-west from the capital of Antananarivo. It has a population of 14,784 inhabitants in 2018.

Rivers
The commune is at the border of the Ikopa River.

References

Populated places in Analamanga